MCDL may refer to:
1450, MCDL in Roman numerals
Mai-chan's Daily Life
Mason County District Library
Miguel de Cervantes Digital Library
Model Composition Definition Language
modern controlled dream lab
Modular Chemical Descriptor Language
Motor City Disassembly Line
Motor Controller Data Link